Mostafa Tabrizi (born 1945 in Bojnourd) is a psychologist and counselor and reformist politician who is currently representing Bojnourd constituency in the first term of the Parliament of Iran in the Islamic Consultative Assembly.

He is a professor at Allameh Tabatabai University and the director of Roozbeh Counseling Center. He was also the first representative of Bojnourd in the Islamic Consultative Assembly after the Islamic Revolution.

References 

Living people
1945 births
Members of the 1st Islamic Consultative Assembly
Iranian psychologists